John Nix may refer to:
 John Nix (American football)
 John Nix (Australian footballer)
 John Ashburner Nix, English businessman and politician